is the debut Japanese extended play (second overall) by South Korean singer Taemin under EMI Records, a division of Universal Music Japan. It was released digitally and physically on July 27, 2016.

Background and release
On February 26, 2016, Taemin released his first single in Japanese, "Press Your Number", previously released on his first studio album, Press It. On June 23, 2016, Taemin's Japanese debut was announced with the mini album Sayonara Hitori, including a showcase on his 23rd birthday. On July 5, he released the music video for "Sayonara Hitori". The album was released on July 27, including four new songs and "Press Your Number" (Japanese Version).

According to Oricon, Sayonara Hitori sold 38,490 copies on the first day of release, and debuted at third place on the daily albums chart. On August 3, the Korean version of the album was released, titled Goodbye, containing the previous Japanese tracks and the Korean version of "Sayonara Hitori".

Track listing

Charts

Sales

Release history

References

External links
  
  

Taemin EPs
EMI Records EPs
2016 EPs
J-pop EPs
Japanese-language EPs